Louis Hayes (also called Louis Hayes with Nat Adderley and Yusef Lateef) is the eponymous debut album by American jazz drummer Louis Hayes recorded in 1960 for Vee-Jay Records. The personnel includes the Cannonball Adderley's 1960 Quintet with Yusef Lateef in place of the leader. The album was also re-released in 1974 under Lateef's name as Contemplation.

Reception 

Scott Yanow of AllMusic states "Although one misses the fiery altoist, the contrast between Nat's exciting (if sometimes erratic) cornet and Yusef's dignified yet soulful tenor make this an above-average session of swinging bop".

Track listing 
 "Hazing" (Yusef Lateef) - 3:33
 "Rip de Boom" (Cannonball Adderley) - 5:16
 "Teef" (Sylvester Kyner) - 9:47
 "I Need You" (Barry Harris) - 7:36
 "Back Yard" (Harris) - 5:48
 "Sassy Ann" (Nat Adderley) - 4:24
 "Hazing" [Take 1] (Lateef) - 3:42 Bonus track on CD reissue
 "Rip de Boom" [Take 1] (Cannonball Adderley) - 5:18 Bonus track on CD reissue
 "Teef" [Take 1] (Kyner) - 7:44 Bonus track on CD reissue
 "I Need You" [Take 1] (Harris) - 7:44 Bonus track on CD reissue
 "Sassy Ann" [Take 5] (Nat Adderley) - 3:55 Bonus track on CD reissue

Personnel 
 Louis Hayes – drums
 Yusef Lateef - tenor saxophone
 Nat Adderley - cornet
 Barry Harris - piano
 Sam Jones - bass

References 

1960 albums
Louis Hayes albums
Yusef Lateef albums
Vee-Jay Records albums